The Imperial Seal of the Emperor of Manchukuo had a design of orchid (Cymbidium goeringii) flower, with five sorghum branches in between the five orchid petals. It was entirely yellow.

The design was based on Cymbidium goeringii, the favorite flower of the Emperor of Manchukuo. Sorghum was the staple food of Manchukuo and was added as a part of the design.

The imperial seal was adopted on 25 April 1934. It also appeared on the Flag of the Emperor of Manchukuo.

Gallery

See also 
 Flag of Manchukuo
 Heirloom Seal of the Realm
 Imperial Seal of Japan
 Imperial Seal of Korea

References

Politics of Manchukuo